Swiss Family Treehouse is a walk-through attraction featured at several Walt Disney Parks and Resorts, located at Magic Kingdom, Tokyo Disneyland and Disneyland Park in Disneyland Paris. The walk-through attraction is centered on a giant treehouse where everyone can hear and see various scenes based on the 1960 Disney film Swiss Family Robinson.

History

The Swiss Family Treehouse opened November 18, 1962, in Adventureland at Disneyland, two years after the Disney film Swiss Family Robinson (1960). Imagineer Bill Martin worked out the treehouse's design; Disney animator Wolfgang Reitherman, who designed the treehouse for the movie, contributed. The tree species was dubbed "Disneyodendron semperflorens grandis -- large, everblooming Disney tree."

John Mills, who played Father Robinson in the movie, and his daughter Hayley appeared at the attraction's opening. The attraction was a walk-through rather than a ride, in which visitors walked up 68 steps in the trunk of the tree through various "rooms" designed on the theme of the movie, with items and structures made to appear salvaged from a 19th-century shipwreck and desert island finds. When it opened, the attraction required a C ticket. The attraction originally opened with reddish brown leaves. However, the red leaves faded very easily in the sun and were eventually switched to green leaves sometime during the early 1960s.

When the Magic Kingdom opened at Walt Disney World Resort on October 1, 1971, the Swiss Family Treehouse was one of the original attractions of Adventureland. Similarly, when Euro Disneyland (now Disneyland Paris) opened on April 12, 1992, it featured a version of the attraction located in Adventureland, named La Cabane des Robinson. Tokyo Disneyland also has a Swiss Family Treehouse which opened in 1993, ten years after the park's debut.

In March 1999, the original attraction at Disneyland was closed. Refurbished and remodeled with a new theme, it reopened in June the same year as Tarzan's Treehouse, based on Disney's 1999 film Tarzan. In September 2021 the attraction closed. In April 2022 it was confirmed that it would reopen with a different theme. and in November 2022 it was announced that it will reopen in 2023 as the Adventureland Treehouse, which will again be inspired by Swiss Family Robinson.

Note

References

External links
 Magic Kingdom site
 Tokyo Disneyland site
 Disneyland Paris site
 Photos Magiques - La Cabane des Robinson

Walt Disney Parks and Resorts attractions
Magic Kingdom
Tokyo Disneyland
Disneyland Park (Paris)
Adventureland (Disney)
1962 establishments in California
1999 disestablishments in California
1971 establishments in Florida
1992 establishments in France
1993 establishments in Japan
The Swiss Family Robinson